Mocedades is a Spanish singing group from the Basque Country, who represented Spain in the Eurovision Song Contest in 1973 with the hit song "Eres tú". Since June 2014, Mocedades has been the name of two bands: one with Izaskun Uranga as its leader and the other with Javier Garay. A third group, El Consorcio, is composed of former Mocedades members who left the group but have continued a career together outside the Mocedades brand.

Group formation

In 1967, in the Basque city of Bilbao, three young sisters, Amaya, Izaskun and Estibaliz Uranga, formed a vocal trio named Las Hermanas Uranga (The Uranga Sisters). They sang in various locations at Bilbao. During their rehearsals, their brothers and friends joined. Eventually they decided to form a vocal group named Voces y guitarras ("Voices and Guitars") with folk and spiritual music and The Beatles as their influences. The members of Voces y guitarras were Amaya Uranga, Izaskun Uranga, Estibaliz Uranga, Roberto Uranga, Rafael Blanco, Sergio Blanco, José Ipiña, Javier Garay and Francisco "Paco" Panera. They spent a year performing around their hometown before sending a demo cassette to producer Juan Carlos Calderón in Madrid. He took an immediate interest in the group and renamed them Mocedades, meaning "youths," from the Spanish word mocedad, which means "youth." Javier Garay could not join them because of his military service, and so Mocedades started out as an eight-member group.

Eurovision and worldwide success

In 1970, both Ipiña (for military service) and Panera (to become a professor at a local university)  left Mocedades. Javier Garay who had previously belonged to Voces y Guitarras rejoined the group in 1970 after serving in the Spanish military in Africa.  Estíbaliz Uranga and the Blanco brothers followed in 1971, and in 1972 Ipiña returned and Carlos Zubiaga (from Los Mitos) joined.   It was with this configuration of six (three Uranga siblings, Zubiaga, Garay and Ipiña), known in Spain as "The Six Historic Ones", that Mocedades achieved its greatest successes.

The group was now on its way to making a remarkable string of hits, most notably "Eres tú " ("You are..."), runner up in 1973's Eurovision Song Contest and the next year a massive hit in Europe and the United States of America. "Eres tú" became one of the only Spanish language songs to reach the top 10 in the United States, peaking at #9 in the Billboard Hot 100 chart and also reaching the top 10 on the Adult Contemporary chart.  The B-side of the single was the English-language version of the song ("Touch the Wind"), but radio stations preferred to play the original A-side version.  There were also several cover versions of the tune in both English and Spanish, only one of which ("Touch the Wind" as done in English by Eydie Gorme), charted, becoming a minor Adult Contemporary hit.  The song was re-released in English as "Touch The Wind" in later years.  It was subsequently released in German (Das bist Du, or "You Are That"), French (C'est pour toi, or "It Is For You"), Italian (Viva noi, or "Long Live Us"), and Basque (Zu Zara, or "You are").  The song was the only U.S. Billboard hit for Mocedades; a follow-up, "Dime Señor" ("Tell Me, Lord", with "I Ask The Lord" on its B-side), flopped.

The 1973 Eurovision Song Contest was marked by a scandal, with charges that "Eres tú" was plagiarized and merely a rewrite of the Yugoslav entry from the 1966 contest ("Brez Besed", sung by Berta Ambrož).  Nevertheless, "Eres tú" was not disqualified. After winning second place in the contest, and as of 2013 the highest score for Spain with 125 points, the song went on to become a huge international hit. (Per Mocedades' homepage [below] Juan Carlos copyrighted the lyrics in 1973)

However, many more hits followed in Latin America and Spain, most notably "Tómame o déjame" ("Take Me or Leave Me"), "El vendedor" ("The Peddler"), "La otra España" ("The Other Spain") and "Me siento seguro" ("I Feel Secure"). In 1980 Mocedades signed up to CBS Records, now Sony, and recorded more songs for the Spanish-speaking market, including "¡Ay amor!" ("Oh Love") and "Amor de hombre" ("Love of Man"), which was the first Mocedades track to enter English-speaking charts since the smash hit "Eres tú".

In 1984, the lead singer, Amaya Uranga, left the group to pursue a solo career, and was replaced by Ana Bejerano, with whom Mocedades recorded three more albums for CBS. For the third album, also José Ipiña and Carlos Zubiaga had left the group, and had been replaced by Iñaki Uranga, one of the youngest brothers of the family. The comparisons between Amaya and Ana were lethal for Mocedades' mainstream popularity, and after this last album at Sony, the group was almost disbanded when Ana, Iñaki and Roberto left it, leaving Izaskun and Javier as the only historic members left. They reformed the group adding Ines Rangil, José García and Iñigo Zubizarreta to the group, establishing Izaskun as the female leader of the team and recovering the style of the first years, without a particular soloist at all. In 1995, the re-formed Mocedades made another album entitled "Suave luz" ("Soft light") before the new members left again in 1996. They were quickly replaced by Idoia Arteaga, Jose Antonio Las Heras, Arsenio Gutierrez and Fernando Gonzalez, and this new team worked again with Juan Carlos Calderon to make an album for Walt Disney Records, where they performed their own versions of Disney songs in Spanish. They started appearing on television again but Izaskun had a car accident in 1999 which forced her to stay in bed for two years during which time the group stopped performing. Due to the lack of work, Idoia, Arsenio and Fernando left Mocedades, while José Antonio and Javier patiently waited for Izaskun's full recovery.

In 2001 Mocedades came back, recruited Luis Hornedo and Iratxe Martinez, and started performing live concerts in Spain and Latin America with some success, while they promoted themselves on the Internet. They recorded several Beatles covers which were never released. 2005 proved to be an annus horribilis for Mocedades, since three members from different phases of the group died in a matter of months, Rafael Blanco, Roberto Uranga and José Antonio Las Heras (who was still active in the group). He was replaced by a returning Fernando González. Iratxe left the group and the music business, and was replaced by Rosa Rodríguez. Mocedades, with Izaskun Uranga, Javier Garay, Luis Hornedo, Rosa Rodríguez and Fernando Gonzalez recorded a new album, "Mocedades canta a Juan Luis Guerra", with songs from the Dominican singer Juan Luis Guerra. This album was only released in Latin America and remains the only Mocedades album unreleased in Spain. In 2010, Fernando took a temporary leave and was replaced by Edorta Aiartzagüena for their successful tour through the US. Fernando came back after their return to Spain in 2011. In June 2012, Javier Garay announced an impending new album. The first two songs, "Fue mentira" and "El diluvio universal", are available on iTunes. Work on the album was halted, however, due to the sudden departure of Rosa Rodríguez and Fernando Gonzalez from the group at the end of 2012. Early in 2013 they were replaced by Begoña Costa and Aitor Melgosa who participated in the group's 45th anniversary tour of Mexico. In June 2014, just after a successful tour of Mexico, Izaskun Uranga , the only member of the group who had never left it since its foundation as Las Hermanas Uranga, decided to leave the group and, since she also had the rights to use the name, she formed her own group also named Mocedades, with former members Rosa Rodríguez, Fernando Gonzalez, and Arsenio Gutierrez and new member José María Santa María. In August 2014, after just two months with the new formation, Arsenio Gutierrez left and was replaced by José María Cortés, who was himself replaced by José Miguel Robles a short while later. 
Meanwhile, the original Mocedades continued with Javier Garay, Luis Hornedo, Begoña Costa, Aitor Melgosa and new member Icíar Ibarrondo, and they began recording a new album in July 2014. In late 2018 Begoña Costa left the original group and was replaced by Ana Bejerano, returning after an absence of 25 years.

Members
The first date listed in brackets is the year in which the member joined Mocedades – the second date is the year in which they left.

Amaya Uranga (1969–1984)
Izaskun Uranga (1969–present)
Estibaliz Uranga (1969–1972)
Roberto Uranga (1969–1993)
Sergio Blanco (1969–1972)
Rafael Blanco (1969–1972)
Javier Garay (1970–present)
José Ipiña (1969–1970) (1972–1989)
Francisco Pañera (1969–1970)
Carlos Zubiaga (1972–1989)
Ana Bejerano (†2022) (1985–1993, 2018–2022)
Iñaki Uranga (1989–1993)
José Garcia (1993–1996)
Iñigo Zubizarreta (1993–1996)
Ines Rangil (1993–1996)
Arsenio Gutiérrez (1997–1999)
Idoia Arteaga (1997–1999)
José Antonio Las Heras (1997–2005)
José Fernando González (1997–1999) (2005–2010) (2010–2012)
Iratxe Martínez (2001–2005)
Luis Hornedo (2001–present)
Rosa Rodríguez (2005–2012)
Edorta Aiartzagüena (2010–2011)
Begoña Costa (2013–2018)
Aitor Melgosa (2013–present)
Belén Esteve (2022-present)

More than twenty-five people have been part of Mocedades since its inception.

Eres Tú Covers

A well known cover version of "Eres Tú" was recorded by Perry Como on 29 April 1974.

A guitar instrumental version of "Eres Tú" was used in a Bank of New Zealand TV advertising campaign in the 1990s.

In the movie Tommy Boy, there's a scene in which Chris Farley and David Spade sing the original Spanish version of "Eres Tú".

Discography

Albums

1969 Mocedades 1
1970 Mocedades 2
1971 Mocedades 3
1973 Mocedades 4
1974 Mocedades 5
1975 La otra España
1976 El Color de tu Mirada
1977 Mocedades 8
1978 Kantaldia
1978 Mocedades 10
1980 Amor
1981 Desde que tú te has ido
1982 Amor de hombre
1983 La musica
1984 15 años de música
1984 La vuelta al mundo de Willy Fog
1986 Colores
1987 Sobreviviremos
1992 Intimamente
1995 Suave luz
1997 Mocedades canta a Walt Disney
2007 Mocedades canta a Juan Luis Guerra

Release dates in Spain are shown except the 2007 album which was only released in America.

Compilation albums

 Recuerdos de Mocedades
 Lo mejor de Mocedades
 Especial de: Mocedades
 Especial de: Mocedades 2
 Mocedades 11/12
 Mocedades
 Mocedades 2
 Mocedades en Euzkera
 Todo Mocedades
 Mocedades 3
 Álbum de oro
 15 éxitos 15—Mocedades
 14 éxitos de Mocedades
 12 grandes éxitos
 Lo mejor de Mocedades 2
 20 de colección
 Antología—Sus 30 grandes canciones
 Antología 2
 Queridos Mocedades
 Internacional
 Serie Brillantes—Mocedades
 Lo mejor de Mocedades 3
 Serie Platino—20 Éxitos—Mocedades
 Personalidad
 Personalidad Vol. II
 Grandes Éxitos
 Más allá + Mocedades 8
 Lo mejor de Mocedades 4
 Ayer y hoy
 Ídolos de siempre
 Colección la vida por delante
 Latin Stars – Mocedades – 15 Éxitos
 Colección original
 Recuerdos
 30 aniversario
 Tómame o déjame
 La otra España
 Maitechu mía
 Las cosas sencillas
 40 grandes éxitos
 Mocedades – RCA Club
 Éxitos de Mocedades
 22 Ultimate Latin hits 2002

Singles

Songs not included in the original albums 
1969 Navidad Feliz (Happy Christmas) (never released on vinyl or on CD but sung on the Spanish TV network TVE with Marisol)
1970 Viejo Marino (side B of a special edition single (45rpm) of the Latin religious song Pange Lingua)
1970 Un mundo mejor (not released, sung on the Spanish TV network TVE.  Mocedades and Voces Amigas both sang this song in the competition to choose a group to represent Spain in Eurovision.)
1973 Gitano (originally not released, included in the re-mastering of  Mocedades 5 and on Eres tú, los grandes éxitos.  Mocedades chose Eres tu over this song to compete in Eurovision.)
1973 4 covers of the song Eres tu done in German: Das Bist Du, French: C'est pour toi, English: Touch the Wind and Italian: Viva noi.  The same melody and orchestration was used for each cover but the translations of the lyrics were quite different from the original Eres tu.
1981 El Niño Robot (The Robot Kid) (included in the album Cosas de niños in which several Spanish groups sing children's songs)
1981 Los Cochinitos Dormilones (The 3 Little Sleepy Pigs) (included in the album Cosas de niños)
1981 Desde que tú te has ido was released in Brazil and Portugal with 2 songs re-done in Portuguese.  The title song Desde que tu te has ido was redone as Despedida (Se voce for embora) and Peter Skellern's You're a Lady was redone as Reencontro.  Both Portuguese versions can now be heard on YouTube.
1983 Amor primero (duet with Patxi Andión on one of his albums)
1983 Lo creas o no (cover of the American hit song: Believe It or Not the theme song of the American TV program The Greatest American Hero) (never included in any of the albums by Mocedades but appears on side B of the single Maitechu mía, with Plácido Domingo; it is also included in  Antología 2)
1985 Lluvia de plata (a duet with Sergio y Estibaliz on their album Cuidado con la noche which was recorded after Amaya Uranga left the group but before Ana Bejerano joined the group.)
1986 Ay, amor (a duet with Jose Luis Perales on one of his albums.)
1992 Las 1001 Américas (included on a 45rpm single with the two theme songs from the cartoon series Las 1001 Americas)
1992 Volando en tu imaginación (included on a 45rpm single with the two theme songs from the cartoon series Las 1001 Americas)
1997 Mi tierra (a duet with Nino Bravo in his second greatest hits album. Although Nino Bravo had died in 1973, two sets of Greatest Hits albums were produced with some songs artificially made into duets with modern Spanish singers.)
1997 Dicen (a duet with Nino Bravo in his second greatest hits album. Other singers in this song included Eva Ferri, Sandra Morey, Ma Conchita Alonso, Marcos Llunas, Jacobo Calderon (son of album producer Juan Carlos Calderon,) Michelle and Maria Caneda.)
???? Vieja ciudad (never released on its own but finally included in Antología 2)
???? Tiempo de vals (never released on its own but finally included in Antología 2)

Covers of Eres tú 
                        
101 Strings – Eres tu
Acker Bilk – Eres tu
Al estilo de Mocedades – Eres tu
Alvaro Clemente – Eres tu
Amaya Uranga/Juan Carlos Calderon – Eres tu
Anacani – Eres tu
Andrés Calamaro – Eres tu
Annemieke & Jan Rot – Dicht Bij Jou (Dutch)
Atalaje – Eres tu
Austin Kley & Mantovani – Eres tu
Bedevilers – Eres tu (punk rock)
Bert Kaempfert –  Touch The Wind (English)
Bertín Osborne – Eres tu
Bing Crosby – Eres tu
Bo Derek – Eres tu
Bres Bezed – Eres tu
Bullerfnis – Rør Ved Mig (Danish)
Byron Lee and the Dragonaries – Eres tu
Calito Soul – Eres tu
Cerveza Mahou – Eres tu
Daniela Castillo –  Eres tu
Dansk top – Rør Ved Mig (Danish)
David and the High Spirits – Eres tu
Eydie Gorme – Eres tu
El Chaval De La Peca – Eres tu
El Consorcio – Eres tu
El Frenillo de Gaugin – Eres tu (Punk Rock)
El ser y ser – Eres tu (Rap)
Estela Raval – Eres tu (from Argentina)
Floyd Cramer – Touch The Wind (English)
Gé Korsten – Touch The Wind (English)
Gebroeder Brouwer – Eres tu (Trumpet instrumental)
GrupoSarao – Eres tu
Hella Joof & Peter Frödin – Rør Ved Mig (Danish)
Howard Morrison Chor – Eres tu
III of a Kind Philippines – Eres tu
Ilanit – Eres tu
Inger Lise Rypdal – I Mitt Liv (Norwegian)
Inger Öst – Rör vid mig (Swedish)
Instrumental – Eres tu
Jimmy Mitchell – Eres tu (Spanish with American accent)
Johanna of La Academia 4ta Generación – Eres tu
Johnny Mathis and Juan Carlos Calderon – Touch the Wind (English with Spanish chorus)
Johnny Reimar – Rør Ved Mig (Danish)
Johnny Rodriguez – Eres tu
José Augusto – Eres tu
José Calvário – Eres Tu (orchestral version)
Juan Carlos Calderón – Eres tu (Composer version)
Justo Lamas – Eres tu
Karaoke – Eres tu
Karel Gott, Spravny Ton – Eres tu  (Czech)
Kathy Kelly – Eres tu
Katri Helena – Runoni Kaunein Olla Voit (Finnish)
Katri Helena – Sinä Vain (Finnish)
Kelly Family – Eres tu
Khanh Ha – Co Gai Rung Mo (Vietnamese)
Korean Choir – Eres tu
La Decada Prodigiosa – Eres tu
Lady lu – Eres tu
Landscape – Touch The Wind (English)
Lecia & Lucienne – Lecia & Lucienne – Rør Ved Mig (Danish)
Lettermen – Eres tu
Liceo Panamericano – Eres tu
Little Angels Of Korea – Eres tu
Lola Ponce – Eres tu
Luis Chacon – Eres tu
Luis Miguel – Eres tu
Lupita D'Alessio – Eres tu
Mantovani Orchestra – Eres tu
Mariachi Vargas – Eres tu
Mona – I mitt liv (Norwegian)
Pan Flute – Eres tu (Pan Flute)
PANDORA – Eres tu
Parrita – Eres tu
Patricia Y Los Stars – Eres tu
Patti Donelli @ USC-Pgh – Touch the Wind (English)
Percy Faith – Touch the Wind (English)
Perry Como – Eres tu
Perpetuum Jazzile – Brez besed/Eres tu (ironic medley of Eres tu with the song Calderon was accused of copying)
Perry Como – That's You (English)
Petula Clark – Will My Love Be You (English)
Pistas – Eres tu (Panflute)
Ray Conniff – Eres tu
Reggae Chico Man – Eres tu
Regina Orozco – Eres tu
Rika Zarai – C'est pour toi (French)
Rina Hugo – Jy's vir my  (Afrikaans)
Roberto Delgado –  Eres tu (Instrumental)
Rob's Band – Eres tu
Rodrigo e Rogério – É você (Brazilian Portuguese)
Romantica de Xalapa – Eres tu 
Sandy Caldera – Eres tu
Shegundo Galarza e a Sua Grande Orquestra – Eres Tu (orchestral version)
Sonny James – Eres tu
Soul Sanet – Eres tu
Spaanse Schaep Cast – Er is toe (Dutch)
Stef Meeder – Tweedle dee, Eres tu medley instr
Supremas de Mostoles – Eres tu
Sweethearts – Rør Ved Mig (Danish)
TBC – Rør Ved Mig (Danish Rap)
Tish Hinojosa – Eres tu
Unknown, tenor – Du Bist Wie Die Sonne (German)
volkana – Eurovision medley including Eres tu
Wheeler St James – Touch the wind (English)
Willeke Alberti – Waar naartoe (Dutch)
Zereno – Eres tu

See also

Related acts:
Sergio y Estíbaliz
El Consorcio
Mikel Uranga
Txarango
Los Mitos
Zurrumurru
Trigo Limpio

References

External links 
 Official site and forum
 Mocedades Group
 
 

1969 establishments in Spain
Musical groups established in 1969
Basque music bands
Eurovision Song Contest entrants for Spain
Spanish musical groups
Eurovision Song Contest entrants of 1973
Universal Music Latin Entertainment artists